Don Lang may refer to:

Don Lang (musician) (1925–1992), trombone player and band leader
Don Lang (third baseman) (1915–2010), third baseman in Major League Baseball
Donald Lang, accused of murdering prostitutes in Chicago